Bartosz is a Polish given name and a surname derived from Bartłomiej, the Polish cognate of Bartholomew.

People with the given name 
 Bartosz Beda, Polish contemporary artist
 Bartosz Bereszyński (born 1992), Polish footballer
 Bartosz Białkowski (born 1987), Polish footballer
 Bartosz Bosacki (born 1975), Polish footballer
 Bartosz Brenes (born 1989), house DJ, producer, remixer and record label owner
 Bartosz Broniszewski (born 1988), German footballer
 Bartosz Chajdecki (born 1980), Polish composer
Bartosz Krzyżaniak-Gumowski (born 1977) founder, product director, product designer
 Bartosz Cichocki (born 1976), Polish political scientist, historian and ambassador to Ukraine
 Bartosz Domański (born 1980), Polish figure skater
 Bartosz Fabiniak (born 1982), Polish footballer
 Wojciech Bartosz Głowacki (1758–1794), Polish peasant and a member of the peasant volunteer infantry during the Kościuszko Uprising in 1794
 Bartosz Huzarski (born 1980), Polish road bicycle racer
 Bartosz Iwan (born 1984), Polish footballer
 Bartosz Jurecki (born 1979), Polish handball player
 Bartosz Kaniecki (born 1982), Polish footballer
 Bartosz Kapustka (born 1996), Polish footballer
 Bartosz Karwan (born 1976), Polish footballer
 Bartosz Kaśnikowski (born 1989), Polish footballer
 Bartosz Kizierowski (born 1977), Polish freestyle swimmer
 Bartosz Kopacz (born 1992), Polish footballer
 Bartosz Kurek (born 1988), Polish volleyball player
 Bartosz Lawa (born 1979), Polish footballer
 Bartosz Łeszyk (born 1980), Polish futsal player
 Bartosz Majewski (born 1987), Polish modern pentathlete
 Bartosz Nowicki (born 1984), Polish middle distance runner
 Bartosz Osewski (born 1991), Polish javelin thrower
 Bartosz Paluchowski (born 1989), Polish pair skater
 Bartosz Papka (born 1993), Polish footballer
 Bartosz Paprocki (1543–1614), Polish and Czech writer, historiographer, translator, poet, herald and pioneer in the Polish and Czech genealogy
 Bartosz Piasecki (born 1986), Norwegian fencer
 Bartosz Romańczuk (born 1983), Polish footballer
 Bartosz Rymaniak (born 1989), Polish footballer
 Bartosz Salamon (born 1991), Polish footballer
 Bartosz Slusarski (born 1981), Polish footballer
 Bartosz Soćko (born 1978), Polish chess Grandmaster
 Bartosz Szeliga (born 1993), Polish footballer
 Bartosz Szymoniak (born 1984), Polish singer
 Bartosz Tarachulski (born 1975), Polish footballer
 Bartosz Waglewski (born 1978), Polish rap artist
 Bartosz Wolski (born 1980), American sprint canoer
Bartosz Zmarzlik (born 1995), Polish motorcycle speedway rider
Bartosz Drabek (born 2004), Polish footballer

People with the surname 
 Bogna Bartosz, Polish classical mezzo-soprano and alto.
 Jakub Bartosz (born 1996), Polish footballer
 Joanna Bartosz (born 1954), Polish gymnast

Fictional characters with the name
 Bartosz Tiedemann, in the German science-fiction series Dark

See also 
 
 
 Bartek (disambiguation) (diminutive of Bartosz)
 Bartoszek (surname)

References 

Polish masculine given names